Syria (SYR) competed at the 1983 Mediterranean Games in Casablanca, Morocco. The medal tally was 5.

Nations at the 1983 Mediterranean Games
1983
Mediterranean Games